Adolf Turakainen (25 March 1932 – 26 October 1996) was a Finnish sprinter. He competed in the men's 200 metres at the 1952 Summer Olympics.

References

1932 births
1996 deaths
Athletes (track and field) at the 1952 Summer Olympics
Finnish male sprinters
Olympic athletes of Finland
Place of birth missing